The 1970 West Virginia Mountaineers football team represented West Virginia University in the 1970 NCAA University Division football season. It was the Mountaineers' 78th overall season and they competed as an independent. The team was led by head coach Bobby Bowden, in his first year, and played their home games at Mountaineer Field in Morgantown, West Virginia. They finished the season with a record of 8–3.

Schedule

Roster

References

West Virginia
West Virginia Mountaineers football seasons
West Virginia Mountaineers football